was a Japanese film director and screenwriter. His son is a fellow film director .

Career
Born in Tokyo, Satō graduated from the University of Tokyo in 1956 with a degree in French literature. He joined the Toei studio and worked as an assistant to such directors as Tadashi Imai and Miyoji Ieki. He debuted as a director in 1963 with Rikugun Zangyaku Monogatari, for which he won a best newcomer's award at the Blue Ribbon Awards. While starting in mostly yakuza film, Satō eventually became known for big budget spectaculars. The Go Masters, a China-Japan co-production he co-directed with Duan Jishun, won the grand prize at the Montreal World Film Festival in 1983. He won the Japan Academy Prize for Director of the Year in 1989 for The Silk Road.

Sato died in Tokyo on 9 February 2019.

Filmography

References

External links
 
 

1932 births
2019 deaths
Japan Academy Prize for Director of the Year winners
Japanese film directors
People from Tokyo
University of Tokyo alumni
Japanese screenwriters